James Carabine (23 November 1911 – 2 December 1987) was a Scottish footballer, who played as a right back.

Career
In the club game, Carabine was most closely associated with Third Lanark, serving as a player from 1931 to November 1946 and then taking over as manager, until May 1950.

As a player, he won the 1934–35 Scottish Division Two title a year after suffering relegation from the top tier, then featured on the losing side in the 1936 Scottish Cup Final. In the three major competitions he made 262 appearances and scored 19 goals for the club.

As an international, Carabine represented Scotland in three official matches, appearing against the Netherlands (21 May 1938), Ireland (8 October 1938) and England (15 April 1939). He also featured in two unofficial games against Eastern United States and the American Soccer League (in which he scored a hat-trick) in a 1939 tour, and ten wartime internationals (all but one against England, his last being an 8–0 defeat on 16 October 1943).

On resigning from his role as manager of Third Lanark in 1950, Carabine noted 'I've had enough'. In the months following his resignation he began writing sports columns for the Daily Express.

See also
List of Scotland national football team captains
 List of Scotland wartime international footballers

References

1911 births
1987 deaths
People from Blantyre, South Lanarkshire
Scottish footballers
Scottish football managers
Scotland international footballers
Scotland wartime international footballers
Third Lanark A.C. managers
Third Lanark A.C. players
Scottish Football League players
Scottish Football League representative players
Association football fullbacks
Footballers from South Lanarkshire
Scottish Football League managers
Scottish Junior Football Association players
Scottish sportswriters